Lampl is a surname. Notable people with the surname include:

Cody Lampl (born 1986), American-German ice hockey player
Frank Lampl (1926–2011), Czech-British businessman
Kenneth Lampl (born 1964), American composer and lecturer
Peter Lampl (born 1947), British philanthropist